Day of the Evil Gun is a 1968 American traditional Western starring Glenn Ford, Arthur Kennedy, and Dean Jagger. It was directed by Jerry Thorpe.

Plot
Angie Warfield and her two children are kidnapped by Apaches. Lorn Warfield (Glenn Ford), who had been away a long time, sets out to rescue his family, with the unwanted help of his neighbor Owen Forbes (Arthur Kennedy). Warfield is a former gunman trying to forget his violent past. Forbes, a decent, humane rancher, is also in love with Warfield's wife and feels guilty that he did not try to prevent the kidnapping.

An Indian trader (Dean Jagger), who feigns insanity (as the Indians will not kill a crazy person), reluctantly provides Warfield with some information. Next, Warfield and Forbes are captured by the Apaches and staked out on the ground to die. However, Mexican bandit DeLeon (who has dealings with the Indians) believes Warfield's story that he hid his money before he was caught and cuts him loose. Warfield manages to convince DeLeon to free Forbes and to lead them to the Apache encampment. Forbes mistakenly kills DeLeon before he can show them where the camp is.

The two men detour to a town where a doctor is being overwhelmed caring for the victims of cholera. They buy supplies, and Forbes learns the location of the Apache camp. On the way, they enter a deserted Mormon settlement, where they encounter a detachment of U.S. Cavalry led by "Captain" Jefferson Addis. However, all is not what it seems. It turns out that Addis, who is actually a corporal, and the rest killed the real captain so that they could trade two wagons full of weapons and ammunition to the Apaches in return for an army payroll the latter recently captured. The Apaches, however, have other ideas; they attack. During the battle, Warfield arranges it for them to steal a wagon. The wagon leaves deep tracks allowing him easily to locate the Indian camp. Warfield and Forbes rescue the captives.

Safely back home, Forbes challenges Warfield (who is now unarmed, having traded his gun to a storekeeper for clothing for his family) to a duel for the woman, but Warfield just turns and walks away. Forbes throws him a pistol, Warfield refuses to pick it up. Forbes then shoots Warfield in the leg. Before Forbes can finish him off, he is shot and killed by the storekeeper using Warfield's gun.

Cast

 Glenn Ford as Lorn Warfield
 Arthur Kennedy as Owen Forbes
 Dean Jagger as Jimmy Noble
 John Anderson as Captain Jefferson Addis
 Paul Fix as Sheriff Kelso
 Nico Minardos as Jose Luis Gomez de la Tierra y Cordoba DeLeon
 Dean Stanton as Sergeant Parker
 Pilar Pellicer as Lydia Yearby
 Parley Baer as Willford
 Royal Dano as Dr. Eli Prather
 Ross Elliott as Reverend Yearby
 Barbara Babcock as Angie Warfield
 James Griffith as Storekeeper - Hazenville

References

External links
 
 
 
 
 

1968 films
Metro-Goldwyn-Mayer films
1968 Western (genre) films
American Western (genre) films
Revisionist Western (genre) films
1960s English-language films
Films directed by Jerry Thorpe
1960s American films